Avondale railway station is a closed railway station on the North Coast railway line, Queensland, Australia. Most of the buildings of the closed station remain including the station platform and goods sheds.

It is possible to cross the railway tracks on foot just east of the old station at a marked crossing. 

A little further east between the station and the river is Avondale Road, with a bridge over the train line where the train descends (when heading east) through a cutting before it crosses the Yandaran Creek via a railway bridge. From the Avondale Road bridge it is possible to get a good view of the goods trains crossing the river.

References

Disused railway stations in Queensland
North Coast railway line, Queensland